Lago Argentino Department is a department in Santa Cruz Province, Argentina. It has a population of 7,500 (2001) and an area of 37,292 km². The seat of the department is in El Calafate.

Lago Argentino is a major lake in the department.

Municipalities
 El Calafate
 El Chaltén
 Tres Lagos

References
Instituto Nacional de Estadísticas y Censos, INDEC

Departments of Santa Cruz Province, Argentina